Willie Louis Reid (born September 19, 1982) is a former American football wide receiver. He was drafted by the Pittsburgh Steelers in the third round of the 2006 NFL Draft after playing college football at Florida State. Reid also played for the Philadelphia Eagles and Dallas Cowboys.

Early life
Reid attended Warner Robins High School and was a four-year letterman in football and basketball. As a junior football player, he was voted the Georgia Offensive Player of the Year and was named to the All-Southern team by the Orlando Sentinel.

College career
Reid attended Florida State University, where he played as a wide receiver and punt returner. He returned a punt for an 87-yard touchdown against Penn State in the 2006 Orange Bowl, setting an Orange Bowl record. He was named the game's MVP after amassing 235 all-purpose yards (180 yards in punt returns and 55 yards in receptions). At Florida State, Reid was a social science major.

Professional career

Pittsburgh Steelers
Reid was selected by the Pittsburgh Steelers in the third round of the 2006 NFL Draft, the 95th overall pick. He was placed on injured reserve because of a foot injury. Entering the 2007 NFL season, Reid was projected as the starting punt returner for the Steelers. However, he failed to impress new coach Mike Tomlin and the Steelers traded a draft pick for veteran returner Allen Rossum. Reid was released by the Steelers on August 30, 2008.

Philadelphia Eagles
On September 1, 2008, Reid was signed to the practice squad of the Philadelphia Eagles. He was placed on injured reserve midway through the season.

Dallas Cowboys
Reid signed with the Dallas Cowboys on June 15, 2009. He was released during final cuts on September 5, 2009.

References

External links
Florida State Seminoles bio

1982 births
Living people
People from Houston County, Georgia
American football wide receivers
American football return specialists
Florida State Seminoles football players
Pittsburgh Steelers players
Philadelphia Eagles players
Players of American football from Georgia (U.S. state)